= Bend Brewing Company =

Brewery based in Bend, Oregon, U.S.

Coordinates: 44°3′37.5″N 121°18′49.5″W

- Location: Bend, Oregon, United States
- Opened: 1995

Bend Brewing Company is a brewery based in Bend, Oregon, in the United States. The business was established in 1995 and operates a restaurant in downtown Bend with views of the Deschutes River. Bend Brewing Company also owns Waypoint.
